The 2019 Bill Beaumont County Championship Division 2 was the 18th version of the competition that is part of the annual English rugby union County Championship organised by the RFU for the tier 2 English counties.  Each county drew its players from rugby union clubs from the third tier and below of the English rugby union league system (typically National League 1, National League 2 North or National League 2 South).  The counties were divided into two regional sections with the winners of each meeting in the final held at Twickenham Stadium. 

At the end of the group stage, Leicestershire were dominant in Pool 1, winning all three games (albeit one which was a walkover), including an impressive win against a strong East Midlands side, while Surrey were equally impressive in topping Pool 2, also winning three out of three.  In the final, Leicestershire finished as convincing winners with an emphatic 38 – 13 victory over Surrey, in what was their second division title in three years.

Competition format
The competition format is two regional group stages divided into north and south with four teams in each group. This means that two teams in the pool had two home games, while the other two had just one.  The RFU have taken fixtures from the previous year into account so that county sides that only played one home game in that competition now get two games and vice versa.  At the end of the group stage the top teams with the best record from each group (north and south) advance to the final held on 2 June 2019 at Twickenham Stadium.

Promotion and relegation occurs every two seasons, with accumulated points taken into consideration.  At the end of the 2017–18 season, Durham (north) and Hampshire (south) were promoted to Division 1, replacing East Midlands (north) and Surrey (south) who dropped down into Division 2. Cumbria and North Midlands were relegated into Division 3, being replaced by promoted sides, Essex and Sussex.  There will now be no promotion or relegation until the end of the 2020 competition.

Participating Counties and ground locations

Group stage

Division 2 North

Round 1

 The match was scratched and Leicestershire were awarded a five point win after Staffordshire could not raise a side; Staffordshire were also deducted five points.

Round 2

Round 3

Division 2 South

Round 1

Round 2

Round 3

Final

Individual statistics
 Note that points scorers includes tries as well as conversions, penalties and drop goals.  Appearance figures also include coming on as substitutes (unused substitutes not included).  Statistics also include final.  Unfortunately due to poor press reporting the majority of scorers outside of the East Midlands, Leicestershire and Surrey teams are unknown.

Top points scorers

Top try scorers

Competition records

Team
Largest home win — 44 points
47 – 3 Sussex at home to Essex on 11 May 2019
Largest away win — 78 points
78 – 0 Leicestershire away to Warwickshire on 11 May 2019 
Most points scored — 42
78 – 0 Leicestershire away to Warwickshire on 11 May 2019 
Most tries in a match — 12
Leicestershire away to Warwickshire on 11 May 2019 
Most conversions in a match — 9
Leicestershire away to Warwickshire on 11 May 2019 
Most penalties in a match — 3
East Midlands at home to Warwickshire on 4 May 2019 
Most drop goals in a match — 1
Warwickshire away to East Midlands on 4 May 2019

Player
Most points in a match — 24
 Joe Wilson for Leicestershire away to Warwickshire on 11 May 2019
Most tries in a match — 2 
Multiple players
Most conversions in a match — 8
 Carlie Carter for Somerset at home to Sussex on 18 May 2019
Most penalties in a match — 3
 Charlie Reed for East Midlands at home to Warwickshire on 4 May 2019 
Most drop goals in a match — 1
 Dan O'Brien for Warwickshire away to East Midlands on 4 May 2019

Notes

See also
 English rugby union system
 Rugby union in England

References

External links
 NCA Rugby

2019
2018–19 County Championship